Cecidochares rufescens is a species of tephritid or fruit flies in the genus Cecidochares of the family Tephritidae.

Distribution
Brazil.

References

Tephritinae
Insects described in 1913
Taxa named by Mario Bezzi
Diptera of South America